Developmental Review is a quarterly peer-reviewed academic journal which publishes review articles in the field of developmental psychology. Presenting research that bears on important conceptual issues in developmental psychology, Developmental Review: Perspectives in Behavior and Cognition provides lifespan, aging, infancy, child, and adolescent behavioral scientists with authoritative articles that reflect current thinking and cover significant scientific developments, with a particular emphasis on human developmental processes.
It was created in 1981 by Charles Brainerd and is published by Elsevier. The current editor-in-chief is Valérie Camos (University of Fribourg). According to the Journal Citation Reports, the journal has a 2020 impact factor of 8.308.

References

External links

Elsevier academic journals
Publications established in 1981
Quarterly journals
Developmental psychology journals
English-language journals